Wigglesworthia glossinidia is a species of gram-negative bacteria which was isolated from the gut of the tsetse fly. W. glossinidia is a bacterial endosymbiont of the tsetse fly.  Because of this relationship, Wigglesworthia has lost a large part of its genome and has one of the smallest known genomes of any living organism, consisting of a single chromosome of 700,000 bp and a plasmid of 5,200.  Together with Buchnera aphidicola, Wigglesworthia has been the subject of genetic research into the minimal genome necessary for any living organism.  Wigglesworthia also synthesizes key B-complex vitamins which the tsetse fly does not get from its diet of blood. Without the vitamins Wigglesworthia produces, the tsetse fly has greatly reduced growth and reproduction.  Since the tsetse fly is the primary vector of Trypanosoma brucei, the pathogen that causes African trypanosomiasis, it has been suggested that W. glossinidia may one day be used to help control the spread of this disease.

History 
W. glossinidia was first described in 1995 and was named for the British entomologist Sir Vincent Brian Wigglesworth.

References

External links 
 Genome  News Network article on Wigglesworthia
  University of Bath minimal genome research
 Wigglesworthia glossinidia brevipalpis complete proteome

Bacteria described in 1995